Ochlodes ochracea   is a Palearctic butterfly in the Hesperiidae (Hesperiinae). It is found in Amur, Southeast China and Japan.

The larva feeds on Carex, Calamagrostis and Brachypodium species.

References

Ochlodes
Butterflies described in 1861
Butterflies of Asia
Taxa named by Otto Vasilievich Bremer